The 1951 Idaho Vandals football team represented the University of Idaho in the 1951 college football season. The Vandals were led by first-year head coach Raymond "Babe" Curfman and were members of the Pacific Coast Conference. Home games were played on campus at Neale Stadium in Moscow, with one game in Boise at old Bronco Stadium at Boise Junior College and another at Memorial Stadium in Spokane, Washington.

Led on the field by quarterback Wayne Anderson and halfback Glen Christian, Idaho compiled a  overall record and lost all three games in the PCC.

In the rivalry game with Montana at Missoula four weeks earlier, Idaho began an eight-game winning streak over the Grizzlies with a 12–9 win to regain the Little Brown Stein.

Prior to the season in late March, university president Jesse Buchanan requested and received the resignations of head coach Dixie Howell and two assistants, due to "lack of harmony" on the coaching  One of those assistants was Curfman, who was then asked by the administration to be the interim coach during the upcoming spring drills. He made a good impression and was re-hired as head coach in

Schedule

 One game was played on Thursday (at Utah on Thanksgiving)

All-conference
No Vandals were on the All-Coast team; tackle Don Ringe was named to the second team. Honorable mention were end Jerry Ogle and 
guard Steve Douglas.

NFL Draft
One senior from the 1951 Vandals was selected in the 1952 NFL Draft:

One junior was selected in the 1953 NFL Draft:

One sophomore was selected in the 1954 NFL Draft:

 Often incorrectly listed as a UI Vandal, tackle Norm Hayes (1954 draft, #217) played at College of Idaho in Caldwell.
List of Idaho Vandals in the NFL Draft

References

External links
Gem of the Mountains: 1952 University of Idaho yearbook – 1951 football season
Go Mighty Vandals – 1951 football season
Idaho Argonaut – student newspaper – 1951 editions

Idaho
Idaho Vandals football seasons
Idaho Vandals football